Carola Zirzow (born 15 September 1954, in Prenzlau) is an East German sprint canoer who competed in the mid-1970s. She won two medals at the 1976 Summer Olympics in Montreal with a gold in the K-1 500 m and a bronze in the K-2 500 m events.

Zirzow also won three gold medals at the ICF Canoe Sprint World Championships with one in the K-2 500 m event (1975) and two in the K-4 500 m (1974, 1975).

References

1954 births
Living people
Sportspeople from Prenzlau
People from Bezirk Neubrandenburg
East German female canoeists
Olympic canoeists of East Germany
Canoeists at the 1976 Summer Olympics
Olympic gold medalists for East Germany
Olympic bronze medalists for East Germany
Olympic medalists in canoeing
ICF Canoe Sprint World Championships medalists in kayak
Medalists at the 1976 Summer Olympics
Recipients of the Patriotic Order of Merit in silver